The Samuel Gould House is a historic house at 48 Meriam Street in Wakefield, Massachusetts.  Built c. 1735, it is one of the oldest houses in Wakefield, and its only surviving period -story gambrel-roofed house.  It was built by Samuel Gould, whose family came to the area in the late 17th century.  It has had modest later alterations, including a Greek Revival door surround dating to the 1830s-1850s, a porch, and the second story gable dormers.

The house was listed on the National Register of Historic Places in 1989.

See also
National Register of Historic Places listings in Wakefield, Massachusetts
National Register of Historic Places listings in Middlesex County, Massachusetts

References

Houses on the National Register of Historic Places in Wakefield, Massachusetts
Georgian architecture in Massachusetts
Houses completed in 1735
Houses in Wakefield, Massachusetts